Sandra Rimstedt is a Swedish European and World champion bridge player. Rimstedt comes from a Bridge playing family including her sister, Cecilia Rimstedt and twin brothers Mikael Rimstedt and Ola Rimstedt.

Bridge accomplishments

Wins
 World Bridge Series Women Teams (1) 2022
 European Women Pairs (1) 2015

Runners-up
 Venice Cup (1) 2017
 Youth European Championship (2) 2004, 2005
 Machlin Women's Swiss Teams (1) 2017

References

External links
 
 

Swedish contract bridge players
Living people
Year of birth missing (living people)